I Am an ESP (also known as I'm a Paranormal Phenomenon) is a 1985 Italian comedy film written and directed by Sergio Corbucci.

Plot 
Roberto Razzi, the skeptical and atheist host of the TV-program "Future", is a well-known debunker of pseudoscientists and gurus. During a travel in India, he will receive paranormal powers, that will put at risk his professional and sentimental life.

Cast 

Alberto Sordi as Roberto Razzi
Eleonora Brigliadori as Olga
Elsa Martinelli as Carla Razzi
Claudio Gora as Prof. Palmondi
Maurizio Micheli as Priest
Gianni Bonagura: De Angelis
Donald Hodson as Babasciò
Rocco Barocco as Maraja
Ines Pellegrini as Concubine of Maraja 
Néstor Garay as TV owner
Pippo Baudo as himself

References

External links

Italian comedy films
1985 comedy films
1985 films
Films directed by Sergio Corbucci
1980s Italian-language films
1980s Italian films